Alta power station is a hydroelectric power station located on the Alta-Kautokeino River in Troms og Finnmark county, Norway.  The power station is located in Alta Municipality, just north of the border with Kautokeino Municipality.  It is operated by Statkraft, a Norwegian state-owned electric company, and it opened in 1987.

Below the power station, the river has salmon, and is a good fishing river. It is the tallest dam in the country.

Controversy

The background for the controversy was a published plan by the Norwegian Water Resources and Energy Directorate (NVE) that called for the construction of a dam and hydroelectric power plant that would create an artificial lake and inundate the Sámi village of Máze. After the initial plan met political resistance, a less ambitious project was proposed that would cause less displacement of Sámi residents and less disruption for reindeer migration and wild salmon fishing for which the river is widely regarded as the best Atlantic Salmon river in the world. 

In 1978, the popular movement against development of the Alta-Kautokeino waterway (Folkeaksjonen mot utbygging av Alta-Kautokeinovassdraget) was founded, creating an organizational platform for first opposing and then resisting construction work. This group and others filed for an injunction in Norwegian courts against the Norwegian government to prevent construction from commencing.

In the fall of 1979, as construction was ready to start, two acts of civil disobedience started. At the construction site itself at Stilla, a number of activists sat down and blocked the machines from starting their work; and at the same time, a number of Sámi activists camped outside the Norwegian parliament, starting a hunger strike. 

The prime minister at the time, Odvar Nordli, pre-empted such an escalation by promising a review of the parliament's decision, but the Norwegian parliament subsequently confirmed its decision to dam the river. More than one thousand protesters chained themselves to the site when the work started again in January 1981. The police responded with large forces, and at one point 10% of all Norwegian police officers were stationed in Alta and quartered in a cruise ship. The protesters were forcibly removed by police.

For the first time since World War II, individuals were arrested and charged with violating laws against rioting. The central organizations for the Sámi people discontinued all cooperation with the Norwegian government. The Supreme Court ruled in favor of the government in early 1982, at which point organized opposition to the power plant ceased, and the power plant was built.

In popular culture
The controversy around this project inspired the plot of the 2019 film Frozen II, which is heavily inspired by Sámi culture, including this particular conflict with the national government.

See also
Nibutani Dam, another dam involved in a conflict between indigenous and national interests

References

Hydroelectric power stations in Norway
Statkraft
Alta, Norway
Dams in Norway
Dams completed in 1987